The 1968 Pacific Southwest Open was a combined men's and women's professional tennis tournament played on outdoor hard courts at the Los Angeles Tennis Club in Los Angeles, California in the United States. It was the 42nd edition of the tournament, the first of the Open Era, and ran from September 14 through September 22, 1968. Rod Laver won the singles title and the $3,800 first prize.

Finals

Men's singles
 Rod Laver defeated  Ken Rosewall 4–6, 6–0, 6–0

Women's singles
 Rosie Casals defeated  Maria Bueno 6–3, 6–1

Men's doubles
 Ken Rosewall /  Fred Stolle defeated  Cliff Drysdale /  Roger Taylor 7–5, 6–1

Women's doubles
 Ann Jones /  Françoise Dürr defeated  Margaret Court /  Maria Bueno 6–3, 6–2

See also
 Laver–Rosewall rivalry

References

Los Angeles Open (tennis)
Pacific Southwest Open
Pacific Southwest Open
Pacific Southwest Open